Lyudmila Verbitskaya  (née, Lyudmila Bubnova; 17 October 1936 – 24 November 2019) was a Russian linguist and teacher. She served as president of Saint Petersburg State University.

Career
Lyudmila Alekseevna Verbitskaya was born in Leningrad on 17 October 1936.

She earned a doctorate in philology from Leningrad State University (1958). During her academic career, her research focused on Modern Russian speech, stylistics, vocabulary, and semantics.

Verbitskaya was rector (1994–2008), and then president (2008–2019) of Saint Petersburg State University. She also served as the chair of the Russian Academy of Education (during the period 11 November 2013 – 2018), and as the Academy's Honorary President, 2018–2019. She chaired the Board of Trustees of the Russkiy Mir Foundation, an organization formed for “promoting the Russian language, as Russia’s national heritage and a significant aspect of Russian and world culture, and supporting Russian language teaching programs abroad.” In addition, she served as Chair of the International Association of Russian Language and Literature Teachers (MAPRYAL), a professional organization founded in 1967.

She was a close friend of Vladimir Putin.

She died in St. Petersburg on 24 November 2019. The 49th International Scientific Philological Conference, held at St. Petersburg State University in December 2020, was dedicated to her memory.

Key publications
 Verbitskaya, Nosova, Rodina. 2002.  Sustainable development in higher education in Russia: The case of St. Petersburg State University. Higher Education Policy.
 Verbitskaya. 2013.  Russian Language in the Late Twentieth to Early Twenty-First Centuries. Russian Journal of Communication. 5 (1). p. 64-70
 Verbitskaya, Malykh, Zinchenko. 2015.  Cognitive predictors of success in learning Russian. Psychology in Russia.

Awards
 1997, Queen's Anniversary Prize for Higher and Further Education, Great Britain
 1999, Stapenning medal, University of Amsterdam
 2000, The International Astronomical Union named a small planet, formerly No. 7451, after Verbitskaya
 2001, Russian Federation Presidential prize in Education 
 2006, named an Honorary Citizen of St. Petersburg
 2007, Russian Government Prize
 2011, Order of Honour

References

External link

1936 births
2019 deaths
Women linguists
Women heads of universities and colleges
Saint Petersburg State University alumni
Academic staff of Saint Petersburg State University
20th-century Russian educators
Full Cavaliers of the Order "For Merit to the Fatherland"
Recipients of the Order of Honour (Russia)
Knights of the Order of Merit of the Republic of Poland
Deaths from cancer in Russia